Marlene Catelyne van der Velden (born 12 July 1970) is a Dutch rower. She competed in the women's eight event at the 1996 Summer Olympics.

References

External links
 

1970 births
Living people
Dutch female rowers
Olympic rowers of the Netherlands
Rowers at the 1996 Summer Olympics
People from Likasi